Pedro da Silva Nava  (June 5, 1903 – May 13, 1984) was a Brazilian writer and physician.

Works
Baú de Ossos
Balão Cativo 
Chão-de-Ferro
Beira-Mar
Galo-das-Trevas
O Círio Perfeito

References

Brazilian male writers
1903 births
1984 deaths
1984 suicides